Dunajovice is a municipality and village in Jindřichův Hradec District in the South Bohemian Region of the Czech Republic. It has about 200 inhabitants.

References

External links

Villages in Jindřichův Hradec District